Three is the second studio album of Australian jam band The John Butler Trio.

All the music and lyrics were written and arranged by John Butler. The album was recorded, engineered and mixed by Shaun O'Callaghan at Studio Couch, North Fremantle, Western Australia. It was mastered at Woodstock Studios by Robin Mai, Nicky Bomba and Joe Camilleri. The album was produced by the John Butler Trio and Shaun O'Callaghan. The cover concept was designed by John Butler with Matt and Iowana at Insomnia Design.

There were guest appearances by:
Paul Boon - didgeridoo
George Rrurrambu - intro vocals on "Money"
Rosie Johnstone, David Broadfoot & Brenda Fost - backing vocals

In 2001 Three won ARIA Award for Best Independent Release.

In the United States it was released on ATO Records, with a few more tracks than the Australian CD - partly because it was the first John Butler Trio album released in the United States.

Australian track listing
All music and lyrics written and arranged by John Butler.

 "Betterman" – 8:16
 "Attitude" – 6:09
 "Media" – 5:19
 "Believe" – 3:59
 "Take" – 8:01
 "Life Ain't What It Seems" – 7:04
 "Money" – 11:33
 "Foundation" – 14:47

U.S. track listing
 "Betterman" – 8:19
 "Attitude" – 6:13
 "Media" – 6:04
 "Believe" – 4:02
 "Take" – 8:05
 "Life Ain't What It Seems" – 8:14
 "Money" – 11:33
 "Pickapart – 2:59
 "Earthbound Child – 3:50
 "Don't Understand" – 4:31

Charts

Weekly charts

Year-end charts

Certifications

References

2001 albums
ARIA Award-winning albums
John Butler Trio albums
ATO Records albums